Daniel Enrico Acker (born 23 September 1990) is a South African rugby union footballer, who most recently played for the .

References

1990 births
Living people
Free State Cheetahs players
Griffons (rugby union) players
Griquas (rugby union) players
Rugby union players from Bloemfontein
Rugby union scrum-halves
South African rugby union players